The Ndu languages are the best known family of the Sepik languages of East Sepik Province in northern Papua New Guinea. Ndu is the word for 'man' in the languages that make up this group. The languages were first identified as a related family by Kirschbaum in 1922.

Along with the Arapesh languages, Ndu languages are among the best documented languages in the Sepik basin, with comprehensive grammars available for many languages.

A diagnostic innovative feature in the Ndu languages is the replacement of the proto-Sepik pronoun *wun ‘I’ with proto-Ndu *an ~ *na.

Languages
Abelam is the most populous language, with about 45,000 speakers, though Iatmül is better known to the outside world. There are eight to twelve Ndu languages; Usher (2020) counts nine:

Ngala
Ndu proper
Iatmul, Manambu, Yelogu (Yalaku), Abelam (Ambulas), Boiken–Koiwat, Gaikundi, Sos Kundi (Sawos Kundi)

Also sometimes distinguished are Keak (close to Iatmul or Sos Kundi), Kwasengen (or Hanga Hundi, close to Ambulas), Burui (close to Gai Kundi), and Sengo.

Phonology
Most Sepik and neighboring languages have systems of three vowels, that are distinct only in height. The Ndu languages may take this reduction a step further: In these languages,  is used as an epenthetic vowel to break up consonant clusters in compound words. That is, the Ndu  languages may be a rare case of a two-vowel system, the others being the Arrernte and Northwest Caucasian languages. However, contrasting analyses of these same languages may posit a dozen vowel monophthongs.

This does not signify  followed by a glottal stop and another .

Morphology
Ndu languages mark first and second person possessors with -n, and third person possessors with -k.
Ambulas
wunɨ-nə mbalɨ
1SG-POSS pig
‘my pig’

ndɨ-ku mbalɨ
3SG-POSS pig
‘his pig’

Manambu
wun-(n)a maːm
1SG-POSS older.sibling
‘my elder sister’

ndɨ-kɨ-ndɨ yaːmb
3SG-POSS-M.SG road
‘his road’

Ndu languages make use of the general locative case suffix -mb (-m in Manambu):
Ambulas
kwalɨ kambɨlɨ-mbə
neck river LOC
‘at the source of the river’

Manambu
ŋgu-aːm
water-LINK.LOC
‘in water’

Ndu languages have two dative-type case markers, with the forms and meanings varying across languages:
-t (-r in Manambu): allative meaning (‘to’ or ‘toward’)
-k: benefactive (beneficiary or recipient) meaning

Examples of dative case markers in Ambulas and Manambu:

Ambulas
ndu mbɨrɨ takwə mbɨr-ət
man PL woman PL-ALL
‘toward the men and women’

ɲjɨmba yə-kwə ndu-kɨ
work do-PRS man-BEN
‘for the men who work’

Manambu
ar-aːr yi-tɨk
lake-LINK.ALL go-1DU.SBJ.IMP
‘Let’s both go to the lake.’

a-ndɨ ɲɨnɨk
that-M.SG child.LINK.BEN
‘for that child’

Dative case markers are also used to mark animate objects of transitive verbs, which is a Sepik-Ramu areal feature. An example of the Ambulas allative case marker -t:
wunɨ ɲan-ɨt kenək-kwə
1SG child-ALL scold-PRS
‘I’m scolding the child.’

Proto-language

Pronouns
Reconstructed proto-Ndu pronouns by Foley (2005):

{| 
!  !! sg !! du !! pl
|-
! 1
| *wɨn || *an || *nan
|-
! 2m
| *mɨn
| rowspan="4" | *mpɨr
| rowspan="2" | *ŋkɨwr
|-
! 2f
| *ɲɨn
|-
! 3m
| *ntɨ
| rowspan="2" | *ntəy
|-
! 3f
| *lɨ
|}

Note that there is a gender distinction for first-person pronouns.

Lexicon
A phonological reconstruction of proto-Ndu has been proposed by Foley (2005). Lexical reconstructions from Foley (2005) are listed below. The homeland of proto-Ndu is located just upstream of Ambunti.

Proto-Ndu reconstructions by Foley (2005)

{| class="wikitable sortable"
! gloss !! proto-Ndu !! Manambu !! Iatmul !! Abelam !! Sawos !! Boiken !! Ngala
|-
| one || *nək || nək || kɨta || nek || kɨtak || napə || nək
|-
| three ||  || mɨwŋkwɨr || kɨwpɨwk || kɨwpɨwk || kɨwpɨwk || mɨwŋkɨwlɨykŋ || mɨwŋkɨwl
|-
| man || *ntɨw || ntiw || ntɨw || ntɨw ||  || tɨw || riw
|-
| water || *ŋkɨw || ŋkɨw || ŋkɨw || ŋkɨw || ŋkɨw || kɨw || ŋkɨw
|-
| rain || *mayt || war || mayk || mac || wirɨ || macɲ || mac
|-
| fire || *ya || ya || ya || ya ||  || hwɨypa || ya
|-
| sun || *ɲa || ɲə || ɲa || ɲa ||  || ɲa || ɲa
|-
| moon || *mpapmɨw || mpapɨw || mpwap || mpapmɨw ||  || pwapwə || kamwɨ
|-
| house || *ŋkəy || wɨy || ŋkəy || ŋkəy || ŋkay || kəy || ŋkəy
|-
| village ||  || təp || ŋkəpma || ŋkay ||  || wɨyə || wɨyə
|-
| breast || *mɨwɲ || mɨwɲ || mɨpə || mɨwɲə ||  || mwɨyɲ || mɨwɲ
|-
| tooth || *nɨmpɨy || ɨwk || nɨmpɨy || nɨmpɨy ||  || nɨmpɨy || nɨmpɨy
|-
| bone || *apə || ap || avə || apə ||  || yapə || ampɨ
|-
| tongue || *tɨkŋa || tɨkalɨr || tɨkat || tɨkŋalɨn ||  || tɨkŋalɨ || tɨkan
|-
| eye || *mɨyR || mɨyr || mɨynɨy || mɨynɨy ||  || mɨynɨy || mɨyl
|-
| nose || *tam(w)ə || tam || tamə || tamə ||  || tamə || tamwə
|-
| leg || *man || man || man || man || man || man || rawɨ
|-
| ear || *wan || wan || wan || wan ||  || wan || 
|-
| egg ||  || mpant || mpantɨ || ŋkɨk ||  || mpwantɨ || ŋkwɨy
|-
| tree || *mɨy || mɨy || mɨy || mɨy ||  || mɨy || mɨy
|-
| name || *cɨ || cɨ || cɨ || ɨy ||  || cɨ || cɨ
|-
| pig || *mp(w)al || mpar || mpak || mpalɨ ||  || pwalɨ || mpwal
|-
| dog || *wac, *war || ac || warə || wacə ||  || warə || pyəp
|-
| snake || *kampwəy || kampay || kampwəy || kampwəy ||  || hampwəy || mapwɨcɨ
|-
| mosquito || *kɨvɨy || kɨvɨy || kɨvyə || kwɨyə ||  || mɨkɨycɨ || cɨvyə
|-
| louse ||  || təkɨyn || mpakwə || nɨmw ||  || kəmalɨ || ɲən
|-
| see || *vɨ || vɨ || vɨ || vɨ ||  || vɨ || təyf
|-
| eat || *kɨ || kɨ || kɨ || kə ||  || hə || kɨ
|-
| go || *yɨ || yɨ || yɨ || yɨ || yɨ || yɨ || yɨ
|-
| come || *ya || ya || ya || ya ||  || ya || ya
|-
| sit || *rə || rɨ || rɨ || rə ||  || rə || yəlkɨy
|-
| stand || *rap(m) || rap || rap || rapm ||  || rapm || 
|}

References

 William A. Foley (2005). "Linguistic prehistory in the Sepik–Ramu basin." In: Andrew Pawley, Robert Attenborough, Robin Hide and Jack Golson, eds, Papuan pasts: cultural, linguistic and biological histories of Papuan-speaking peoples. Pacific Linguistics 572. 109-144. Canberra: Australian National University.
 Donald C. Laycock (1965). The Ndu language family (Sepik District, New Guinea). Pacific Linguistics C-1. Canberra: Australian National University.

External links
 The Manambu Language of East Sepik, Papua New Guinea

 
Middle Sepik languages
Languages of East Sepik Province